Morena Silva de Vaz Setta Baccarin (born June 2, 1979) is an American actress known for portraying Inara Serra in the sci-fi series Firefly and its follow-up film Serenity, Vanessa in the superhero comedy franchise Deadpool, Jessica Brody in the Showtime series Homeland, Dr. Leslie "Lee" Thompkins in the Fox series Gotham, and Elena Federova in the NBC series The Endgame. For Homeland, she received a Primetime Emmy Award nomination for Outstanding Supporting Actress in a Drama Series in 2013.

Early life
Baccarin was born in Rio de Janeiro, Brazil, the daughter of actress Vera Setta and Fernando Baccarin, a journalist. She is of Italian, Portuguese, and Lebanese descent. Morena's debut as an actress was at the age of six for a TV special directed by her grand uncle, who is a theatre director in Brazil. When she was seven, she moved with her family to Greenwich Village, New York, as her father was transferred to work as an editor at Globo TV's headquarters.

Baccarin attended Public School 41 and New York City Lab School for Collaborative Studies, where her future Homeland co-star Claire Danes and she were classmates. She later attended the Fiorello H. LaGuardia High School of Music, Art, and Performing Arts before she entered the theater program at the Juilliard School, where she was in the drama division's Group 29 (1996~2000).

Career
Baccarin landed her first film role in the improvised fashion-world comedy Perfume (2001). This was followed by a lead role in Way Off Broadway (2001).

She served as Natalie Portman's understudy in the Central Park production of The Seagull. The science-fiction drama Firefly (2002) as Inara Serra was Baccarin's first television series, and she reprised her role in the 2005 film Serenity.In February 2005, Baccarin provided the voice for Black Canary in multiple episodes of the animated series Justice League Unlimited. She guest-starred in season two, episode seven of How I Met Your Mother as Chloe, which aired on November 6, 2006. She also guest-starred in three episodes of the television series The O.C. in 2006. Baccarin appeared in the unaired pilot episode of It's Always Sunny in Philadelphia, playing a transgender woman, Carmen. In April 2006 Baccarin was announced to be playing the adult version of recurring villain Adria in the 10th season of Stargate SG-1. She first appeared in season-10 episode "Counterstrike" as adult Adria (the younger versions of Adria were previously played by other actresses). Baccarin reprised her role in the film Stargate: The Ark of Truth.

In May 2009, Baccarin made her off-Broadway debut in Theresa Rebeck's television satire Our House at Playwrights Horizons in New York City. She landed the lead role of Anna, the leader of the alien Visitors, in ABC's 2009–2011 series V, a remake of the 1984 series. In May 2011, shortly following the airing of the show's second-season finale, producers announced that the show would not return for a third season. That same month, Baccarin joined the cast of the Showtime television drama Homeland, for which she received praise for her role as the conflicted wife of a former prisoner of war. On July 18, 2013, she was nominated for Outstanding Supporting Actress in a Drama Series at the 2013 Primetime Emmy awards for her performance.

Baccarin appeared alongside Melissa McCarthy in the 2015 action-comedy Spy as agent Karen Walker. In 2016, Baccarin appeared alongside Ryan Reynolds in the hit film Deadpool as Vanessa Carlysle. She reprised her role in the 2018 sequel Deadpool 2. In 2015, Baccarin began a leading role as Dr. Leslie Thompkins in the Fox show Gotham. She portrayed the character in all five seasons of the show. In 2019, she played a psychologist on the Brazilian TV series Sessão de Terapia (Therapy Session), her first production role in her native country. In 2020, Baccarin co-starred alongside Gerard Butler in the apocalyptic thriller Greenland.

Personal life
In November 2011, Baccarin married American film producer and director Austin Chick. In October 2013, Baccarin and Chick's son was born. In July 2015, Chick filed for divorce, citing irreconcilable differences. In September 2015, Baccarin said that after her divorce was finalized, she planned to marry her Gotham co-star Ben McKenzie, adding that she was pregnant with their child. In March 2016, Baccarin and McKenzie's daughter was born. On March 18, 2016, Baccarin and Chick's divorce became official. In November 2016, Baccarin and McKenzie announced their engagement. They were married in Brooklyn, New York, on June 2, 2017, Baccarin's 38th birthday. In March 2021, Baccarin and McKenzie announced the birth of their son.

Political views and activism
In January 2019, she wrote an opinion piece in Newsweek magazine describing her experiences
working with the International Rescue Committee on behalf of refugees. She was interviewing refugees from Venezuela during a trip to Colombia. She warned of an evolving situation, which could lead to an increase of refugees asking for asylum in the United States. Baccarin became an advocate for women and girls, inspired by her mother's work for women’s rights in Brazil.

In 2019, together with other artists, lawyers, advocates, and refugees, she took part in the Flores Exhibits project. She read the sworn testimony of a migrant child held in detention at the U.S.-Mexico border.

Filmography

Film

Television

Video game
 Destiny 2 (2017), as Sagira (in Curse of Osiris DLC)

Awards and nominations

References

Further reading

External links

1979 births
Living people
Actresses from Rio de Janeiro (city)
American people of Brazilian descent
Brazilian emigrants to the United States
Brazilian film actresses
Brazilian people of Italian descent
Brazilian people of Lebanese descent
Brazilian television actresses
Brazilian voice actresses
Hispanic and Latino American actresses
Juilliard School alumni
Fiorello H. LaGuardia High School alumni
People from Greenwich Village
People with acquired American citizenship
21st-century American actresses